Marit is a Scandinavian female given name equivalent to Margaret. It may refer to:

Mette-Marit, Crown Princess of Norway (née Tjessem Høiby; (born 1973), wife of Crown Prince Haakon, heir apparent to the throne of Norway
Marit Aarum (1903–1956), Norwegian economist, politician, civil servant and feminist
Marit Allen (1941–2007), English fashion journalist and costume designer
Marit Andreassen (born 1966), Norwegian actress
Marit Arnstad (born 1962), Norwegian lawyer and politician 
Marit Bergman (born 1975), Swedish pop musician
Marit Bjørgen (born 1980), Norwegian cross-country skier
Marit Bouwmeester (born 1988), Dutch sailor
Marit Breivik (born 1955), Norwegian team handball player
Marit Christensen (born 1948), Norwegian journalist
Marit Haraldsen (born 1939), Norwegian alpine skier
Marit Hemstad (1928–1971), Norwegian sprinter 
Marit Henie (1925–2012), Norwegian figure skater 
Marit Kaldhol (born 1955), Norwegian poet and children's writer
Marit Velle Kile (born 1978), Norwegian actress
Marit Larsen (born 1983), Norwegian singer and songwriter
Marit Løvvig (born 1938), Norwegian politician 
Marit Maij (born 1972), Dutch politician 
Marit Mikkelsplass (born 1965), Norwegian cross-country skier
Marit Myrmæl (born 1954), Norwegian cross country skier 
Marit Nybakk (born 1947), Norwegian politician
Marit Paulsen (born 1939), Norwegian-born Swedish politician
Marit Rotnes (born 1928), Norwegian politician
Marit Sandvik (born 1956), Norwegian jazz singer
Marit Stiles (born 1969), Canadian politician
Marit Strindlund (born 1972), Swedish conductor
Marit Øiseth (1928–1971), Norwegian cross-country skier
Marit Trætteberg (1930–2009), Norwegian chemist
Marit Tusvik (born 1951), Norwegian author, poet and playwright
Marit van Eupen (born 1969), Dutch rower

See also
Marit (disambiguation)
Maarit, Finnish given name

Feminine given names
Given names derived from gemstones